Tagenarine Brandon Chanderpaul (born 31 May 1996) is a Guyanese cricketer who plays for Guyana in first-class cricket. He is a left-hand opening batsman. He made his international debut for the West Indies cricket team in November 2022. He is the eldest son of West Indies batsman Shivnarine Chanderpaul. He played the role of cricketer Larry Gomes in the Bollywood film 83.

Youth career
As a prolific run scorer for  Guyana at youth level, he earned ​a spot in the Windies squad for the 2014 Under-19s World Cup held in the UAE.

During the World Cup, he scored an unbeaten 84 against Zimbabwe in Abu Dhabi. Chanderpaul's knock helped propel the Windies to an eventual 167 run win over the Zimbabweans.

He then scored 93 against Canada to notch a consecutive man of the match award in a 67 run win. With this victory the West Indians progressed to the tournament's knock out stages.

Domestic career
He plays for Guyana in first-class cricket and made his first-class debut in February 2013 at age 16 for Guyana against Leeward Islands in the regional four-day competition at Sir Vivian Richards Stadium in North Sound.

His father Shivnarine had also made his first-class debut for Guyana as a teenager, when he was 18. Shivnarine was playing the Bangladesh Premier League and was away during the course of his son's debut. 

He was dropped from the Guyana Jaguars Cricket team due to a lack of form however he was still offered a contract with the franchise along with fellow under19 stars: Shimron Hetmyer, Keemo Paul and Gudakesh Motie, all of whom made international debuts for the West Indies.

As of July 31, 2015, he was listed in the Demerara senior team to partake in the Guyana Cricket Board Inter County four-day Competition, where he will look to be a prolific scorer and make a claim for a second burst in first-class cricket.  In the 2016–17 Regional Four Day Competition, Chanderpaul had the chance for several innings with his father; in March 2017, the Chanderpauls became the first father-son partnership to both score 50s in the same First-Class innings since CK and CN Nayudu in 1956–57.

On 13th January 2018, Tagenarine Chanderpaul scored his maiden first class century against Barbados. He scored unbeaten 101 runs facing 275 balls hitting nine boundaries. Finally match ended in a draw.  

On 10th January 2019 Tagenarine Chanderpaul scored another century against Windward islands. He scored 117 runs facing 484 deliveries hitting 10 boundaries. Finally Guyana won the match by 8 wickets.   

In October 2019, he was named in Guyana's squad for the 2019–20 Regional Super50 tournament. 

He managed to bring his fine form. He was the second-highest run-getter in the 2021-22 West Indies four-day championship. He scored 439 runs in eight innings at an average of 73.16 including two centuries. His third first class century came against Barbados scoring unbeaten 140 runs which Guyana won the match by 5 wickets. His fourth first class century came against Jamaica scoring 184 runs facing 425 balls hitting 27 boundaries. Finally the match was drawn.

International career

In January 2015 as a 18 year old, he made his Youth International debut for the U19 West Indies side, playing 11 matches, including the 2014 Under-19 Cricket World Cup in the UAE, scoring 293 runs in 6 matches, including a century and two 50s. In August 2022, he was called up to the West Indies A side during the 2022 Bangladesh A tour of the West Indies, scoring an unbeaten century in the second Four Day Game. He scored unbeaten 109 runs from 337 deliveries hitting nine boundaries. Finally the match ended draw. 

On the back of this performance, he was called up for the 2022 West Indian tour of Australia. During the warm up match against the Prime Minister's XI in Canberra in November 2022, he scored a century and half century, opening the batting. Chanderpaul made his debut in the first Test in Perth, receiving his Test cap from Brian Lara. He scored his maiden test half century in first innings and 45 runs in second innings. He top scored in each innings in the second Test in Adelaide (47 and 17) where West Indies were defeated by 419 runs.

On 5th February 2023, Chanderpaul scored his maiden test century against Zimbabwe. Next day he converted his century into double century becoming tenth West Indies batman to do so. Chanderpaul scored unbeaten 207 runs and put 336 run partnership with West Indies captain Kraigg Brathwaite, becoming first pair to put 300+ opening stand for West Indies breaking 33 year old record. Finally the match was drawn and Chanderpaul won player of the match award for his performance.

Awards

 WICB/WIPA Under-19s Cricketer of year 2013

References

External links 
Tagenarine Chanderpaul – Cricinfo profile
Tagenarine Chanderpaul – CricketArchive profile
Tagenarine Chanderpaul – Guyana-Cricket (archived)

1996 births
Living people
West Indies Test cricketers
Guyanese cricketers
Guyana cricketers
Guyanese Hindus
Indo-Guyanese people
Sportspeople of Indian descent
Sportspeople from Georgetown, Guyana
West Indies under-19 cricketers